"Say You Don't Mind" is a song written and originally recorded by English musician Denny Laine. It was a top 20 hit for Colin Blunstone in 1972.

History
Laine wrote the song in 1967 after he had quit The Moody Blues and was forming the Electric String Band. He recorded the song as a solo single, with a string arrangement by John Paul Jones, but it failed to chart.

Episode Six (featuring future Deep Purple singer Ian Gillan and bassist Roger Glover) recorded the song at a BBC session in January 1968, with keyboardist Sheila Carter singing lead. The song was also recorded in 1970 by British psychedelic pop group Orange Bicycle, for their eponymous first album.

The song was revisited by former Zombies frontman Colin Blunstone in 1971 as the closing track on his first solo album, One Year. He had suggested recording the song while the Zombies were still active, but this never happened. The recording featured a string arrangement by Christopher Gunning, which has only vocals and strings, no other instruments. In 2006, Neil Tennant of Pet Shop Boys said, "It's a very energetic song but it's driven by the strings and that's unusual in pop. He has a very delicate voice: I think he's the missing link between Dusty Springfield and Nick Drake." According to Blunstone, Gunning was paid a flat fee of £15 to write the score. The recording was released as a single on Epic Records and became a hit, reaching Number 15 in the UK Singles Chart in February 1972. Laine later said that due to an erroneous publishing contract, he did not receive songwriting royalties from this version.

The song was performed live by Wings on their 1972–3 tours, and was one of the few songs in the live set to feature Laine singing lead vocals instead of Paul McCartney. Laine later recorded another version, after leaving Wings in 1980, featured on the album Japanese Tears. He has continued to feature the song live in concert, and it has appeared on later live albums such as 1997's Performs the Hits of Wings.

References
Citations

Sources

External links
 "Say You Don't Mind" at 45cat.com

1967 songs
1972 singles
Epic Records singles
Paul McCartney and Wings songs
Songs written by Denny Laine